Choodiyan (English: Bangles) is an Indian television series which Premiered on Sony Entertainment Television on 4 September 2000. It was directed by Imtiaz Punjabi and stars Juhi Parmar and Shraddha Nigam.

Plot

'Choodiyan' is a tale of two sisters, Rushali (aged 23 years) and Meghna played by Shraddha Nigam and Juhi Parmar respectively. Their mother passed away in a horrific accident when Rushali was very young. Rushali couldn't cope with the tragedy of losing her mother and goes into trauma. Her brain stopped growing with age and she still has a mental age of an eight years old, behaving and thinking like an eight-year-old child. On the unfortunate day of the accident Rushali didn't let her mother go outside; her mother gives her 'bangals' and said that when she finds and collects the missing bangals she will come back to her. Her mother's words stuck in her head and she still thinks that if she collects enough 'bangals' her mother will return to her.
Her sister, Meghna, is the only source of support and strength for Rushali. Meghna takes care of Rushali and loves her very much. Rushali is everything for Meghna, her whole life revolves around Rushali, she would do any thing for her sister and can not stand to see a single tear in her sister's eyes.
Then a man comes into their life played by Akshay Anand , falling in love with Meghna, but due to her sister's mental condition and her love for her sister, Meghna chooses not to marry.

Cast

 Juhi Parmar as Meghna
 Shraddha Nigam as Rushali
 Akshay Anand 
 Manav Gohil 
 Navin Nischol
 Sulabha Deshpande
   Mehar Kamal
 Rohit Bakshi
   Mukesh Ahuja
   Arun Verma
   Hemakshi

References

External links
 

Indian television soap operas
Sony Entertainment Television original programming
2000s Indian television series